Mick Brown may refer to:
Mick Brown (physicist) (born 1936), Canadian physicist
Mick Brown (judge) (1937–2015), New Zealand jurist
Mick Brown (footballer) (born 1939), Irish football scout and footballer
Mick Brown (angler) (born 1946), British angler and television presenter
Mick Brown (journalist) (born 1950), British freelance journalist
Mick Brown (musician) (born 1956), American drummer who has played in the bands Dokken, Lynch Mob, and Xciter
Mickey Brown (born 1968), English footballer
Mick Brown, British drummer of the bands The Mission and Red Lorry Yellow Lorry
Mick Brown, British radio DJ, performed as Pat and Mick with Pat Sharp

See also
Michael Brown (disambiguation)
Michael Browne (disambiguation)